Kimbimbi is a small town in Kenya's Central Province.

References 

Populated places in Central Province (Kenya)